The Lausitzring (formally known as the Dekra Lausitzring for ownership reasons) is a race track located near Klettwitz (a civil parish of Schipkau, Oberspreewald-Lausitz district) in the state of Brandenburg in northeast Germany, near the borders of Poland and the Czech Republic. It was originally named Lausitzring as it is located in the region the Germans call Lausitz (Lusatia), but was renamed EuroSpeedway Lausitz for better international communication from 2000 to 2010. The EuroSpeedway has been in use for motor racing since 2000. Among other series, DTM (German Touring Car Championship) takes place there annually. It also used to host the Superbike World Championship.

The Lausitzring has a feature which is unique in continental Europe: a high-speed oval race track, as used in the United States by NASCAR and IndyCar. The  tri-oval (similar to Pocono Raceway) was used twice in 2001 and 2003 by open seater CART races named German 500 (won by Kenny Bräck and Sébastien Bourdais), plus a few British SCSA races.

History

As far back as 1986, in the former communist East Germany, it was planned to convert one of the huge open coal mine pits into a race track. In the late 1990s, this idea was taken up again in order to build a replacement for the AVUS in Berlin. The construction of the EuroSpeedway Lausitz began on 17 June 1998 and the facility was officially opened in August 2000.

The stands around the tri-oval have a capacity of 120,000, while the huge main grandstands have 25,000 seats, and unlike many circuits, the entire circuit can be seen from the main grandstand. Next to the racing facility, there is a test oval with two long straights connecting two steeply banked U-shaped corners.

Like all modern tracks, the EuroSpeedway was built to the highest possible safety standards. However, there were three serious accidents at the facility in its first year of operation. On 25 April 2001, former Formula One driver Michele Alboreto was killed on the test oval after crashing at high speed due to a tyre failure. Alboreto was testing an Audi R8 in preparation of his participation at the 2001 24 Hours of Le Mans. Just over a week later, on 3 May 2001, a track marshal was killed when he was hit by a touring car during a test session.

The third serious accident occurred on 15 September 2001, when the venue's tri-oval hosted the 2001 American Memorial. It was the first race of the American CART series to be held in Europe, but it was eventually overshadowed by the accident in which the series' two-time champion Alex Zanardi was involved. Zanardi lost control of his car at the pit exit following a late stop for fuel and the car slid onto the tri-oval, where it was hit from the side by Alex Tagliani's car at full speed. The impact split the front of Zanardi's car from the rest of it and caused the driver to suffer a traumatic amputation of both of his legs. Tagliani was not seriously injured, having suffered some bruising as a result of the crash.

The official EuroSpeedway anthem "Speed Kings" was recorded by the veteran East German band Puhdys in 2000.

The last concert of German hard rock band Böhse Onkelz took place on 17 and 18 June 2005 at the EuroSpeedway Lausitz under the name Vaya Con Tioz, in front of approximately 120,000. It was the biggest open air show by a German band ever.

On 9 October 2005, the EuroSpeedway played host to the A1 Grand Prix series on its road course. The fastest lap of the meeting was set by Nicolas Lapierre and was 0.45 seconds slower than the lap record for the  circuit held by Heikki Kovalainen.

The EuroSpeedway played host to Round 6 of the 2010 Red Bull Air Race World Championship. As the last two events of the 2010 Championship (Rounds 7 and 8) were cancelled, the 2011 series was cancelled as well. The series then suffered an overall three-year hiatus before finally returning in September 2016 and September 2017.

On 1 November 2017, the entire facility was sold to the vehicle inspection company Dekra, which announced plans to modernize it and use it as a proving ground for road car innovations. Amid fears that the purchase would mark the end of public racing events at the circuit, Dekra announced that it would not organize such events, but other companies would remain welcome to organize them and Dekra would rent the circuit to them for the purpose. The DTM has continued to organize races at the circuit ever since.

Layout configurations

Lap times
The official race lap records at Lausitzring are listed as:

Commercial use

Test site 
On 1 November 2017, Dekra acquired the Lausitzring as a test site, especially for autonomous driving. In April 2019 test and verification of communication elements took place on the Lausitzring. Participants were Ford, Samsung, Vodafone, Huawei, LG Electronics  and others. Topics were communication matters.

Entertainment 
Dekra organised also an Open-air festival, that took place in May 2019.

Events 
Complementary racing events, such as DTM are on the agenda.

 Current

 June: ADAC Racing Weekend Lausitzring
 August: Deutsche Tourenwagen Masters, Porsche Carrera Cup Germany, DMV Goodyear Racing Days

 Former

 3000 Pro Series (2005)
 A1 Grand Prix (2005)
 ADAC Formula 4 (2015–2018, 2020, 2022)
 ADAC GT Masters (2007–2017, 2020–2022)
 ASCAR Racing Series (2002–2003)
 Champ Car German 500 (2001, 2003)
 EuroBOSS Series (2004–2005, 2009)
 European Truck Racing Championship (2001–2002)
 FIA GT Championship (2000)
 FIA Sportscar Championship (2003)
 Formula Three Euroseries (2005–2006, 2009)
 Red Bull Air Race World Championship (2010, 2016–2017)
 Sidecar World Championship (2001–2002)
 World SBK (2001–2002, 2005–2007, 2016–2017)
 World Series by Nissan (2003–2004)

See also 

 AVUS

References

External links 
Official website of Lausitzring
e-Tracks: EuroSpeedway Lausitz

A1 Grand Prix circuits
Champ Car circuits
Motorsport venues in Brandenburg
Superbike World Championship circuits
Buildings and structures in Oberspreewald-Lausitz
Sports venues in Brandenburg
2000 establishments in Germany